Huascarán (Quechua: Waskaran), Nevado Huascarán or Mataraju is a mountain in the Peruvian province of Yungay (Ancash Department), situated in the Cordillera Blanca range of the western Andes.  The southern summit of Huascarán (Huascarán Sur), which reaches , is the highest point in Peru, the northern Andes (north of Lake Titicaca), and in all of the earth's Tropics.  Huascarán is the fourth highest mountain in the Western Hemisphere and South America after Aconcagua, Ojos del Salado, and Monte Pissis, respectively.

Name 
Until the 20th century, the mountain lacked a single commonly accepted name but it was rather known by different names within the surrounding towns and villages. The first recorded mention of the name Huascaran appeared in 1850 as Huascan, name given by the local people likely because the mountain rises above the village of Huashco, Huashco getting its name from the Quechua word for rope (waska). At the beginning of the 20th century, the name appeared as Huascarán, a form which has not since changed. It seems that the name Huascarán is merely a contraction of Huashco-Urán. When the mountain was mentioned, it was thought of in connection with the village and was called Huashco-Urán or “Beyond and down from the village of Huashco.”

Other names given to the mountain were Matarao and Mataraju, Mataraju being the name by which the local indigenous inhabitants prefer to call the mountain, from Ancash Quechua mata (twin) and rahu (snow peak), meaning 'twin snow peaks'.

Geography
The two summits are separated by a saddle (called 'Garganta'). The core of Huascarán, like much of the Cordillera Blanca, consists of Cenozoic granite.

Huascarán gives its name to Huascarán National Park which surrounds it, and is a popular location for trekking and mountaineering. The Huascarán summit is one of the points on the Earth's surface farthest from the Earth's center, closely behind the farthest point, Chimborazo in Ecuador.

The summit of Huascarán is the place on Earth with the smallest gravitational force, with an estimated acceleration of 9.76392 m/s2.

Climbing 
Huascarán is normally climbed from the village of Musho to the west via a high camp in the col that separates the two summits, known as La Garganta. The ascent normally takes five to seven days, the main difficulties being the large crevasses that often block the route. The normal route is of moderate difficulty and rated between PD and AD (depending on the conditions of the mountain) according to the International French Adjectival System.

History 
The summit of Huascarán Sur was first reached on 20 July 1932 by a joint German–Austrian expedition. The team followed what would become later the normal route (named today Garganta route). The north peak (Huascarán Norte) had previously been climbed on 2 September 1908 by a U.S. expedition that included Annie Smith Peck, though this first ascent is somewhat disputed.

In 1989, a group of eight amateur mountaineers, the "Social Climbers", held what was recognised by the Guinness Book of Records (1990 edition) to be "the world's highest dinner party" on top of the mountain, as documented by Chris Darwin and John Amy in their book The Social Climbers, and raised £10,000 for charity.

Huascarán Norte 
Apart from the normal route, climbed in 1908 and rated PD+/AD-, all the other routes are committing and serious.
 Northwest ridge ('Italian' route), rated ED1/ED2 climbed on 25 July 1974 by E. Detomasi, C. Piazzo, D. Saettone and T. Vidone. 
 Northwest face ('Polish-Czech' variant), rated ED1/ED2, climbed on 14 July 1985 by B. Danihelkova, Z. Hoffmanova, A. Kaploniak, E. Parnejko and E. Szczesniak.
 North face ('Paragot' route), rated ED1, climbed on 10 July 1966 by R. Paragot, R. Jacob, C. Jacoux and D. Leprince-Ringuet.
 North face ('Swiss' route), rated ED2+, climbed on 23 May 1986 by D. Anker and K. Saurer. This route requires at least four days on the face.
 North face ('Spanish' route), rated ED2+, climbed on 20 July 1983 by J. Moreno, C. Valles and J. Tomas.

Huascarán Sur 
As for the South summit, apart from the normal route all the others are difficult.
 West ridge ('Shield' route), rated D+, climbed on 15 June 1969 by W. Broda, S. Merler and B. Segger. Approach as for the Garganta route but after the route develops over the knife-edge West ridge before getting to the summit icefield.
 West ridge direct ('Lomo fino' route), rated TD-, was climbed on 7 July 2007 by M. Ybarra and S. Sparano. Approach as for the Garganta route but after the route develops straight over the West face.
 Northeast ridge ('Spanish' route), rated TD+, was climbed on 18 July 1961 by F. Mautino, P. Acuna, A. Perez and S. Rivas. The route starts from Chopicalqui col, takes across the upper part of the Matara glacier and reaches the northeast ridge developing across cornices and snow mushrooms.

1970 earthquake 

At least 20,000 people were also killed in Huaraz, site of a 1941 avalanche (see Palcacocha Lake). Estimates suggest that the earthquake killed over 66,000 people. The final toll was 67,000 dead and 800,000 homeless, making this the worst earthquake-induced disaster in the Western Hemisphere.

Also buried by an avalanche was a Czechoslovak mountaineering team, none of whose 15 members were ever seen again.
This and other earthquake-induced avalanche events are often described evocatively as "eruptions" of Huascarán, despite not being of volcanic origin.

An earlier avalanche on January 10, 1962, caused by a rapid rise in temperature,
killed an estimated 4,000 people.

See also

Cordillera Blanca

Bibliography

References

External links 

 
 Huascarán in Yungay, Peru
 Ascenciones al Huascaran, Peru (Spanish)
 Huts on the "Huascarán" mountain
 About "Huascarán" in Portuguese
 Vilem Heckel, in Czech
 Gravity extremes article at newscientist.com

Mountains of Peru
Mountains of Ancash Region
Huascarán National Park
Avalanches
Landslides in Peru
Highest points of countries
Six-thousanders of the Andes